Daming County is a county under the jurisdiction of Handan City in far southern Hebei Province, China. It was formerly one of the capitals of the Northern Song.

History

It was formerly known as Beijing under the Northern Song dynasty, who used it as their northern capital. The city served as an important centre for learning during Imperial China. It was renamed to Daming Fu during the Ming Dynasty and stayed unchanged until the Republican era. French Jesuits settled in the city in 1897 and founded a French College (Fawen 法文). A large Gothic church was erected inside the city walls from 1918 to 1921; it became a cathedral in 1935 and is listed as key cultural relic of the People's Republic of China since 2013.

Administrative divisions
Daming County includes 6 towns, 13 townships, and 1 ethnic township.

Towns:
 Daming, Yangqiao, Wanti, Longwangmiao, Shuguan, Jintan

Townships:
 Shageta Township, Wangcun Township, Pushang Township, Huangjinti Township, Dajie Township, Jiuye Township, Ximuzhuang Township, Sungandian Township, Xifuji Township, Niantou Township, Beifeng Township, Zhangji Township, Hongmiao Township, Yingzhen Hui Ethnic Township

Climate

See also
 Other Damings

References

External links
 Official website of Daming County government

County-level divisions of Hebei
Handan